Bertrand Bitz is a Swiss singer and songwriter, born on March 2, 1978, in Nax (Valais).

Biography 

Bertrand Bitz's early musical education is quite eclectic. In his childhood, he studied solfege and played a brass instrument in the music school of his village band, l'Echo du Mont-Noble. Then he began to practice the organ and the guitar and gradually developed a specific taste for songwriting and interpretation of his self-written songs.The songs of Bertrand Bitz address a lot of themes, from social subjects (consumerism, unemployment) to philosophical interrogations (friendship, passion-love, death, separation). For example, the song Pour combien appears as an uncompromising condemnation of capitalist consumerism which tends to change love into a simple economic good. Bertrand Bitz also possesses a distinctive style. In his songs, lyrics are always in the foreground and are subtly underlined by a musical accompaniment made of uncluttered lines.

In 2003, at this time singer of Hillside, a Swiss pop-rock group based in Sierre, Bitz released the album entitled Instants volés (Stolen instants). The same year his artistic life was transformed by the meeting of Ludovic Pannatier, a lyrics writer.

In 2005, Bitz, under his own name, released a second album, Tout ça nous poursuit (All that is pursuing us), with the collaboration of Ludovic Pannatier and Alexandra Bitz. Included in this album the song Lorsque nos yeux (When our eyes) wins a 4th prize at MyCokeMusic.ch contest in Zürich.

In 2007, he wins second prize at the famous Swiss singing contest "La médaille d'or de la chanson" in Saignelégier. There he sings En Thalasso. Among previous winners of this prestigious competition are Le bel Hubert (1981) or L'Homme Hareng Nu (2007), also known as Laurent Steulet.

On February 1, 2008, Bertrand Bitz was one of Manuel Maury's guests in the prime time TV show "Têtes en l'air" broadcast on Swiss French TV network (TSR). In April 2008, Bertrand Bitz released his first album aimed at a national diffusion  : Multifaces. He also began to work with the manager Jacques S. who is the agent, in particular, of Sarclo. On April 1, 2008, he was received by Gérard Suter in the program "Radio Paradiso" broadcast on Swiss French radio network Radio suisse romande (RSR). On that occasion, Bitz revealed the backgrounds behind the conception of Multifaces. He said he had intended not to create songs too similar but songs reflecting different moments of life. Good moments, he says, inspire more popular, more joyful, songs. Bad moments such as death, sorrow, heartbreak or something else which may affect you, are translated into more tormented songs. Included in Multifaces, L'attente (The wait) is representative of the dinstinctive personal process of reflection which leads Bertrand Bitz to songwriting. In this case, L'attente develops Bertrand Bitz's reflection on the painful consequences of passion-love. "Seul face au silence, face à l'indifférence, l'attente est si longue et la souffrance si douce..." are the words Bertrand Bitz sings. From April 4 to 6, 2008, Bertrand Bitz gives the premiere of Multifaces at Interface theater in Sion.

Discography 
Instants volés (2003)
 Instants volés
 N'écoute que toi
 Mom
 Silver
 I can't stop
Editor: XYZ Records, Saint-Maurice

Tout ça nous poursuit (2005)
 Tout ça nous poursuit
 Lorsque nos yeux
 T'avouer vaincu
Also featuring in the album: Philippe Demont (guitar), Raphaël Gunti (guitar), Florian Alter (violin), Steve Margelisch (drum kit), Ludovic Pannatier (lyrics), Alexandra Bitz (lyrics), Florian Zermatten (music)Editor: Gunt Productions, Sierre

Multifaces (2008)
 Multiface 1
 Clara
 Baisers volés
 En Thalasso
 Et pour combien
 Lorsque nos yeux
 Multiface 2
 Au chômage
 Indélébile
 Laura
 Mine de rien
 En bruissements d'elle
 L'attente
 Multiface 3
 Baisers volés final
Also featuring in the album: Sébastien Bessard (guitar), Benoît Schmid (piano), Gunt (guitar), Sam Amos and Gunt (drum kit), Céline Bugnon (choir)Editor: Lugeon, FroidevilleWebsite: http://www.bertrandbitz.ch/

Notes 

1978 births
Living people
21st-century Swiss  male singers